Northop College in Flintshire, North Wales is jointly operated by Glyndwr University and Coleg Cambria.

Formerly known as the Welsh College of Horticulture and Northop College, it became part of Coleg Cambria when Deeside College merged with Yale College, Wrexham in August 2013.  Degree level courses at the college are run by Glyndwr University.

Coleg Cambria consists of six campuses including Deeside, Yale Grove Park, Yale Bersham Road, Llysfasi, Northop and Wrexham Training.  The encompassed college offers a wide range of courses from Further Education to HNC's and Foundation Degrees for full and part-time students, apprentices and part-time community learners.

Coleg Cambria Northop also offers further and higher education courses and work-based learning studies, it also provides a variety of professional short courses and leisure programmes. Furthermore, the student numbers have increased in recent years, there are approximately 3,000 full-time and 10,000 part-time students. 
</ref>(The Independent, 2018)

Coleg Cambria Northop College specialises in the following subjects: Animal Care / Management, Equine care / Management, Floristry and Horticulture studies.(National Land Based College, 2018)

History 

2010–2013
Merging Colleges
Following Welsh Assembly Government approval Deeside College and Coleg Llysfasi in Ruthin merged on 1 August 2010. The new institution which was one of the largest in Wales and the UK, provided courses for almost 22,000 students each year, employing over 1000 staff, and with an annual income approaching £40million.

The Deeside College Group encompassed three colleges: Deeside College, Northop College and Coleg Llysfasi, together with the Wrexham Training site at Felin Puleston near Rhostyllen, Wrexham, which was part of Coleg Llysfasi prior to the latter's merger with Deeside College.

External links
 Coleg Cambria
 Coleg Cambria Facebook
 Coleg Cambria Twitter
 Coleg Cambria YouTube Channel

References 

Further education colleges in Flintshire